William Lindsay Windus (1822–1907) was an English painter, part of a group of Liverpool painters who were influenced by the Pre-Raphaelite style.

Life and work
He was born in Liverpool, England, was initially taught art by William Daniels (1813–1880), then went on to study at the Liverpool Academy. On a visit to London in 1850 he became converted to the Pre-Raphaelite style. He exhibited his new style of painting with the work Burd Helen at the Royal Academy, London in 1856. The picture caught the eye of Dante Gabriel Rossetti and John Ruskin which helped establish Windus as a respected artist.

His first painting was oil on canvas titled Black Boy, 1844.

See also
List of Pre-Raphaelite paintings
Daniel Alexander Williamson
William Davis
James Campbell
John Lee
Florence Claxton (satirised the works of the Pre-Raphaelites, including Windus, in her painting The Choice of Paris: An Idyll).

External links

William Lindsay Windus online (Artcyclopedia)
Biography of William Lindsay Windus (The website of Bob Speel, 2 Feb 2011)
Study of a trooper from the Dragoon Guards in foul weather order  (oil, c. 1858 - Christie's)

1822 births
1907 deaths
19th-century English painters
English male painters
20th-century English painters
Pre-Raphaelite painters
20th-century English male artists
19th-century English male artists